This is a list of foreign football players who plays or played in the Liga Primer Indonesia.

Angola
 Amâncio Fortes – Semarang United – 2011
 David Kuagica – Minangkabau F.C. – 2011
 Maurito – Minangkabau F.C. – 2011

Argentina
 Oscar Alegre – Bogor Raya F.C. – 2011
 Juan Darío Batalla – Real Mataram – 2011
 Diego Bogado – Bogor Raya F.C. – 2011
 Juan Manuel Cortez – Batavia Union – 2011
 Guillermo Imhoff – Bali Devata – 2011
 Leandro – Batavia Union – 2011
 Leonardo Moyano – Jakarta F.C. – 2011
 Gustavo Hernan Ortiz – Jakarta F.C. – 2011
 Emanuel De Porras – Jakarta F.C. – 2011
 Luciano Rimoldi – Bogor Raya F.C. – 2011
 Fernando Gaston Soler – Real Mataram – 2011

Australia
 Fred Agius – Cendrawasih Papua – 2011
 Andrew Barisić – Persebaya 1927 – 2011
 Robert Gaspar – Persema Malang – 2011
 Andrija Jukic – Bogor Raya F.C. – 2011
 Mario Karlovic – Minangkabau F.C. – 2011
 Josh Maguire – Semarang United – 2011
 David Micevski – Solo F.C. – 2011
 Srećko Mitrović – PSM Makassar – 2011
 Steve Pantelidis – Bintang Medan – 2011
 Billy Quinncroft – Bogor Raya F.C. – 2011
 Goran Šubara – PSM Makassar – 2011
 Milan Susak – Minangkabau F.C. – 2011
 Aleks Vrteski – Solo F.C. – 2011
 Daniel Wilkinson – Cendrawasih Papua – 2011

Brazil
 Amaral – Manado United – 2011
 Amarildo – Semarang United – 2011
 Márcio Bambu – Cendrawasih Papua – 2011
 Carlos Eduardo Bizarro – Persibo Bojonegoro – 2011
 Otávio Dutra – Persebaya 1927 – 2011
 Luís Feitoza – Tangerang Wolves – 2011
 Victor Hugo – Tangerang Wolves – 2011
 Juninho – Minangkabau F.C. – 2011
 Jardel Santana – Manado United – 2011
 Renan Silva – Persija Jakarta – 2018–
 Wallace – Tangerang Wolves – 2011
 Wallacer de Andrade Medeiros – Persibo Bojonegoro – 2011

Cameroon
 Alain N'Kong – Atjeh United – 2011
 Ngon Mamoun – Persema Malang – 2011
 Pierre Njanka – Atjeh United – 2011
 Seme Pierre – Persema Malang – 2011
 Felix Yetna – Manado United – 2011

Chile
 Christian Febre – Real Mataram – 2011
 Luis Eduardo Hicks – Medan Chiefs – 2011
 Javier Rocha – Batavia Union – 2011

Côte d'Ivoire
 Eugène Dadi – Manado United – 2011

England
 Lee Hendrie – Bandung F.C. – 2011

France
 Kevin Yann – Medan Chiefs – 2011

Germany
 Patrick Ghigani – Cendrawasih Papua – 2011

Iran
 Amir Amadeh – Persibo Bojonegoro – 2011
 Javad Moradi – Bandung F.C. – 2011
 Ali Parhizi – Bali Devata – 2011
 Hossein Shiri – Manado United – 2011
 Milad Zeneyedpour – Madura United – 2018

Italy
 Raffaele Simone Quintieri – Semarang United – 2011

Latvia
 Deniss Romanovs – Cendrawasih Papua – 2011

Liberia
 Perry N Somah – Bandung F.C. – 2011
 John Tarkpor Sonkaley – Persebaya 1927 – 2011

Luxembourg
 Benoît Lang – Persema Malang – 2011

Macedonia
 Michael Cvetkovski – Persebaya 1927 – 2011

Montenegro
 Ilija Spasojević – Bali Devata – 2011

Morocco
 Laakkad Abdelhadi – Medan Chiefs – 2011

Netherlands
  Bryan Bono Brard – Medan Chiefs – 2011
  Dane Dwight Brard – Medan Chiefs – 2011
 Pascal Heije – Bali Devata – 2011
  Regilio Jacobs – Tangerang Wolves – 2011
  Jordy de Kat – Tangerang Wolves – 2011
 Richard Knopper – PSM Makassar – 2011
  Raphael Maitimo – Bali Devata – 2011
  Ferd Pasaribu – Medan Chiefs – 2011
  Gaston Salasiwa – Bintang Medan – 2011

Nigeria
 Michael Onwatuegwu – Bandung F.C. – 2011

Portugal
 Guti Ribeiro – Bintang Medan – 2011

Romania
 Cosmin Vancea – Bintang Medan – 2011

Russia
 Sergei Aleksandrovich Litvinov – Solo F.C. – 2011

Serbia
 Žarko Lazetić – Solo F.C. – 2011
 Stevan Račić – Solo F.C. – 2011

Singapore
 Shahril Ishak – Medan Chiefs – 2011
 Baihakki Khaizan – Medan Chiefs – 2011

South Korea
 Na Byung-Yul – Batavia Union – 2011
 Park Chan-Yong – Tangerang Wolves – 2011
 Park Dae-Sik – Atjeh United – 2011
 Yum Dong-Jin – Atjeh United – 2011
 Ahn Hyo-Yeon – Bintang Medan – 2011
 Kim Jong-Kyung – Batavia Union – 2011
 Kwon Jun – PSM Makassar – 2011
 Bok Jun-Hee – Bali Devata – 2011
 Kim Kang Hyun – Persibo Bojonegoro – 2011
 Ku Kyung-Hyun – Tangerang Wolves – 2011
 Kim Sang-Duk – Bandung F.C. – 2011
 Han Sang-Min – Persema Malang – 2011
 Ryung Tae-Pyo – Real Mataram – 2011

Syria
 Muhammad Albicho – Persibo Bojonegoro – 2011
 Marwan Sayedeh – PSM Makassar – 2011

Tahiti
 Alvin Tehau – Atjeh United – 2011

Tunisia
 Amine Kamoun – Bintang Medan – 2011

Indonesia, Liga Primer
Liga Primer Indonesia
 
Association football player non-biographical articles